Michael Baidoo (born 14 May 1999) is a Ghanaian professional footballer who plays as a midfielder for Elfsborg.

Professional career
Baidoo began his career with the Ghanaian club Vision, and moved to the Danish club Midtjylland in 2018. Baidoo made his professional debut with Midtjylland in a 1-1 Danish Superliga tie with FC Nordsjælland on 11 March 2018. He was loaned out for the rest of the season on 31 August 2018 to FC Fredericia.

On 31 July 2019 it was confirmed, that Baidoo had been loaned out to Norwegian club FK Jerv for the rest of 2019. On 20 January 2020 it was confirmed, that Baidoo would continue at the club on loan until the end of 2020. He signed a permanent deal with Jerv at the end of 2020.

International career
Baidoo was called up to a pair of 2015 African U-17 Championship qualification matches for the Ghana U17s, but did not make an appearance. He is a 2-time international for the Ghana U20s.

Honours
Midtjylland
 Danish Superliga (1): 2017–18

References

External links
 
 FCM Profile

1999 births
Living people
Footballers from Accra
Ghanaian footballers
Ghana under-20 international footballers
Association football midfielders
Vision F.C. players
FC Midtjylland players
FC Fredericia players
FK Jerv players
Sandnes Ulf players
Danish Superliga players
Danish 1st Division players
Norwegian First Division players
Ghanaian expatriate footballers
Ghanaian expatriate sportspeople in Denmark
Expatriate men's footballers in Denmark
Ghanaian expatriate sportspeople in Norway
Expatriate footballers in Norway